Millgrove may refer to:

Australia
 Millgrove, Victoria
 Millgrove railway station

Canada
 Millgrove, Ontario

United States
 Millgrove, Indiana
 Millgrove Township, Steuben County, Indiana
 Millgrove, New York
 Hammel and Millgrove, Ohio
 West Millgrove, Ohio